Kadhdhoo Airport  is a domestic airport located on the island of Kadhdhoo in Laamu Atoll, Maldives.

History

Excavation for the runway began on 11 January 1982, and the final layer of the runway was completed on 6 April 1986. 

The project was initiated under the Government's budget alone, additional financial assistance was received from outside, notably from the United Nations Development Program (UNDP), the International Civil Aviation Organization (ICAO) and the Organization of Petroleum Exporting Countries’ Fund (OPEC Fund). The length of the runway at Kadhdhoo airport was 762 meters long and 30 m wide.

When the Maldivian president Maumoon Abdul Gayyoom assumed office in 1978, some of the most pressing problems faced by the country were the immense difficulty involved in traveling between Malé and the outlying islands and the adverse effects in the Maldivian fishing industry due to illegal entry of foreign fishing vessels into the Maldivian territorial waters.

Kadhdhoo is situated halfway between the airport of Malé and Gan.

Facilities
Airport apron is 105 m x 22 m. Short take-off and landing aircraft whose maximum weight does not exceed 5700 kg can be accommodated.

Airlines and destinations

References

External links

Airports in the Maldives
Airports established in 1986